The West Central Conference was an IHSAA-sanctioned conference formed in 1970.  The conference disbanded in 2015, as all five members joined the Western Indiana Conference.

Membership

State Championships

South Putnam (3)
 1986 Football (A)
 2011 Softball (2A)
 2012 Softball (2A)
Monrovia 
2015 Football (2A)

State Runner-Up

Greencastle (2)
 1931 Boys Basketball
 1933 Boys Basketball

Monrovia (1)
 2009 Football (2A)

North Putnam (1)
 2010 Football (2A)

South Putnam
2002 Football (A)

References

Resources 
 IHSAA Conferences
 IHSAA Directory

Indiana high school athletic conferences
High school sports conferences and leagues in the United States
Sports competitions in Indianapolis